"Give It Up! (For the Melodie)" is a 1994 song by Swedish recording artist Melodie MC, released as the first single from his second album, The Return. It features vocals by singer Susanne Bertlin and peaked at number six in Sweden. Additionally, it also charted in Australia, where it reached number 98. A music video was made to accompany the song.

Track listing

Charts

References

1994 singles
1994 songs
Eurodance songs
English-language Swedish songs